Shoshana Damari (March 31, 1923 – February 14, 2006) was a Yemeni-Israeli singer known as the "Queen of Hebrew Music."

Biography

Shoshana Damari was born in Dhamar, Yemen. Her family immigrated  to Mandate Palestine in 1924 and settled in Rishon LeZion.

From a young age Damari played drums and sang accompaniment for her mother, who performed at family celebrations and gatherings of the Yemenite community in Israel. At age 14, her first songs were broadcast on the radio. She studied singing and acting at the Shulamit Studio in Tel Aviv, where she met Shlomo Bosmi, the studio manager who became her personal manager. They wed in 1939 and had a daughter, Nava.

Damari died in Tel Aviv after a brief bout of pneumonia. She died whilst Kalaniyot was sung by her family and friends who had been sitting in vigil during her final few days. She was buried in the Trumpeldor Cemetery in Tel Aviv.

Music career

In 1945, Damari joined Li-La-Lo, a revue theater established by impresario Moshe Wallin. The group performed light entertainment and satire as a counterweight to the serious theater of the time.
Damari became known for her distinctive husky voice and Yemenite pronunciation. 

Her first record was released in 1948 and her best-known song Kalaniyot (Anemones), by Moshe Wilensky, dates from that period. She was especially popular among Israeli soldiers, for whom she frequently performed. After the independence of Israel and throughout the late 1970s, Damari performed all over the United States, France, England, South Africa, Brazil, Cuba, Mexico, Argentina, Venezuela, Colombia, Canada, Scandinavia and Japan.

She was warmly received by the audience at national and international festivals in Israel and abroad, serving as Israel's unofficial cultural ambassador and earning the title of “First lady of Israeli song.”
 
In the mid-1980s, Damari teamed up with Boaz Sharabi for a duet that brought her back into the limelight. 

In 2005, she recorded two tracks for the Mimaamakim album by Idan Raichel's Project and participated in some of their live performances. The two had been slated to begin another joint project.

Awards and recognition
In 1988, Damari was awarded the Israel Prize for Hebrew song. and an ACUM lifetime achievement award in 1995.
On March 31, 2013, Google celebrated her 90th birthday with a Google Doodle.

Film career
Hill 24 Doesn't Answer
Be'Ein Moledet
Hatikvah

See also 
List of Israel Prize recipients
Music of Israel

References

External links

  Jerusalem Post "Renowned singer and cultural icon Shoshana Damari dies" February 14, 2006
 Jewish Virtual Library article on Shoshana Damari

Recordings of Shoshana Damari on The House of Hebrew Songs, National Library of Israel

1923 births
2006 deaths
Yemeni emigrants to Mandatory Palestine
Jews in Mandatory Palestine
Israel Prize in Hebrew song recipients
Israel Prize women recipients
Israeli film actresses
Israeli stage actresses
20th-century Israeli women singers
Jewish Israeli musicians
Jewish Israeli actresses
Deaths from pneumonia in Israel
Burials at Trumpeldor Cemetery
20th-century Yemeni women singers